Volkmarsen  is a small town in Waldeck-Frankenberg district in northern Hesse, Germany. It is home to 6840 residents.

Geography

Location
Volkmarsen lies on the northern edge of the Waldecker Tafel (Waldecker Shield (geology)) where it flattens out into the Diemel Valley, some 28 km northwest of Kassel and 7 km northeast of Bad Arolsen.

Neighbouring communities
Volkmarsen borders in the north on the town of Warburg (Höxter district in North Rhine-Westphalia), in the east on the community of Breuna and the town of Wolfhagen (both in Kassel district), in the south and west on the town of Bad Arolsen and in the northwest on the town of Diemelstadt (both in Waldeck-Frankenberg).

Constituent communities
Besides the main town, which bears the same name as the whole, the town of Volkmarsen consists of the centres of Ehringen, Herbsen, Hörle, Külte and Lütersheim.

History
Volkmarsen's first documentary mention came in 1155. In a safe-conduct from Pope Gregory IX in 1233, Volkmarsen was first described as a town.

On 24 February 2020, a car drove into a crowd at a carnival parade.

Politics

Town council

The town council's 31 seats are apportioned thus, in accordance with municipal elections held in 2006:

Note: FWG is a citizens' coalition.

Elections in March 2016:
CDU      = 12 seats
SPD      = 8 seats
FDP      = 1 seats
FW       = 5 seats
AfD      = 3 seats
Unabhängige (Independents)       = 2

Coat of arms

Volkmarsen's oldest seal dates from 1272. Like the current coat of arms, it shows two men, but sitting on a bench, the Count of Everstein and the Abbot of Corvey, the town's two overlords at the time. Another seal from the mid 14th century shows the now familiar church with two windows with religious figures in each one, believed to have been the Archbishop of Cologne and once again the Abbot of Corvey, reflecting the new ruling arrangement over the town. The two figures in the arms nowadays, however, are Saint Peter (holding the key) and Saint Paul (holding the sword). This became the arms in the 19th century.

Town partnerships
Volkmarsen maintains partnership links with the following:
  Buttelstedt, Thuringia since 1990

Culture and sightseeing

Buildings
The castle Kugelsburg, built about 1200, destroyed in the Seven Years' War.
Catholic Church St. Mary (built 1260)
Lutheran Church (built 1845-1848)
Memorial Wall at the Jewish Cemetery 
St. Elisabeth-Hospital

Economy and infrastructure

Transport
Volkmarsen lies on Autobahn A44 Dortmund – Kassel and on the Warburg-Sarnau railway and offers hourly connections to Kassel.

Established businesses
 Henkelmann - genuine Waldeck sausage specialities
 Phönix Armaturen-Werke Bregel GmbH
 Semtek - lighting, show technology, set-up rental
 Wellmass - Mobile Wellness, Ayurveda and Massage.
 Volkmarsen fire brigade

Personalities

Sons and daughters of the city 

 Katja Eichinger (* 1971), journalist and author, widow of Bernd Eichinger

Other personalities associated with the city 

 Hans Schäfer (* 1927), World champion 1954 in Bern, played a season 1947/48 with the VfR Volkmarsen

References

External links

 
 Herbsen
 Lütersheim
 Volkmarsen fire brigade
 Holocaust Memorial Project for Volkmarsen

Waldeck-Frankenberg